

See also
Lateral surface